Chamanthedon leucocera is a moth of the family Sesiidae. It is known from Kenya and Malawi.

The head and thorax are black brown glossed with bronze. The abdomen is orange with a dorsal series of black-brown patches forming dorsal bands on second and fourth segments. The forewings and hindwings are hyaline (glass like) with black-brown veins and margins. The underside of the forewing has a golden-yellow costal area towards the apex and the underside of the hindwing has an orange-yellow costal area to towards the apex, interrupted by a black-brown spot at the upper angle of the cell.

References

Sesiidae
Moths of Africa
Moths described in 1919